Trochenbrod or Trohinbrod, also in Polish: Zofiówka, or in , in , , was an exclusively Jewish shtetl – a small town, with an area of  – located in the gmina Silno, powiat Łuck of the Wołyń Voivodeship, in the Second Polish Republic and would now be located in Kivertsi Raion of Volyn Oblast in Ukraine. Following the invasion of Poland by Nazi Germany and the Soviet invasion of Poland in September 1939, Zofiówka (official Polish name) was renamed in Russian and incorporated into the new Volyn Oblast of the UkSSR. Two years later, at the start of Operation Barbarossa in 1941, it was annexed by Nazi Germany into the Reichskommissariat Ukraine under a new Germanized name. Trochenbrod (Zofiówka) was completely eradicated in the course of German occupation and the ensuing Holocaust. The nearest villages of today are Yaromel (Яромель) and Klubochyn (Клубочин).

The original settlement inhabited entirely by Jews, was named after Sophie, a Württemberg princess (1759–1828) married to the Tsar of Russia Paul I (hence Sofievka or Zofiówka). She donated a parcel of land for the Jewish settlement in the Russian Partition after the conquest of the Polish–Lithuanian Commonwealth (see new Pale of Settlement district).

History
Sofievka (Trochenbrod) was founded in 1835, after the November Uprising, initially as a farming colony for the dispossessed Jews, and with time developed into a small town. The population grew from around 1,200 inhabitants (235 families) in 1889, to 1,580 in 1897 according to Jewish archives. In the Second Polish Republic, the number of inhabitants reached 4,000. The name Trochenbrod in Yiddish stands for "Dry Bread" or "Bread without Butter".

Towards the end of World War I, Trochymbrid briefly became a part of the Western Ukrainian National Republic and subsequently the Ukrainian National Peoples Republic after unification on January 22, 1919. However, during the Polish–Soviet War, the forces of the re-emerging sovereign Poland and the Red Army fought over the town. It was ceded to Poland in the Peace of Riga signed with Vladimir Lenin, and it became part of the Wołyń Voivodeship in the Kresy Borderlands. Most of the population were engaged in agriculture, dairy farming and tanning.

There were seven synagogues in Trochenbrod, including three big ones. In 1939, the town, along with the rest of Kresy, was invaded by the Soviet Union (see Molotov–Ribbentrop Pact). The rabbi at that time was Rabbi Gershon Weissmann. The Communists exiled him to Siberia after accusing him of being involved in underground salt trading.

The Holocaust

After Nazi Germany invaded the Soviet Union in June 1941, the new German administration established a Nazi ghetto at Trochenbrod, confining there also Jews from nearby villages and towns. The ghetto was liquidated in August and September 1942 in a series of massacres by Order Police battalions. Most of the Jews of Trochenbrod as well as of the neighboring village Lozisht (Ignatówka in Polish) were murdered by the Nazis. According to Virtual Shtetl, over 5,000 Jews were massacred, including 3,500 from Trochenbrod and 1,200 from Lozisht among other nearby settlements.

Fewer than 200 Jews managed to escape death by fleeing into the forest. The Soviet partisans hiding in the nearby village of Klubochyn assisted some 150 survivors. Some Jews joined the resistance in the region and took up partisan actions against the Nazis. The village was totally destroyed and burnt down in 1942, and subsequently leveled out after World War II in Soviet Ukraine. Now only fields and a forest can be found there, and an ominous flatland with an aimless country road running through it.

On November 4, 1942, the Nazis executed 137 inhabitants of the nearby Ukrainian settlement of Klubochyn and burnt it as a reprisal for the actions of local Ukrainian partisans fighting against the Nazis. The partisans from Klubochyn and the surrounding vicinity took up arms against the Nazis and supplied weapons to a local Jewish resistance group. Local nationalist and Ukrainian Soviet partisans also accepted Jewish partisans into their own units and provided protection to more than 150 Jewish families that survived the ghetto at Trochymbrid and nearby Jewish settlements that were hiding in the forest. Vasily Matsuyk, an elderly survivor of a Nazi massacre and director of Klubochyn District Museum recalled the story of one Ukrainian family in Klubochyn executed for assisting Jews.

Upon the invasion of the Ukrainian SSR and the establishment of Reichskommissariat Ukraine, Erich Koch inspected the old Radziwill holdings that the Bolsheviks had not managed to destroy and with Hitler's permission claimed it for himself. He instructed the Kreislandwirt, the official in charge of Tsuman district, to liquidate all Ukrainian villages on the former Radziwill territory. These included but were not limited to Klubochyn, Sylne and Horodyshche. Koch dispatched the Sicherheitsdienst [SD] to facilitate the clearing of his new residence, one of few Polish residents in Klubochyn, a man named Galicki prepared the list handed to the Secret Police, almost all residents of Klubochyn were on the list. In mid 1942 an SD unit arrived in Klubochyn in the night and locked the Ukrainian inhabitants in a barn at dusk. Those in the barn were executed by machine gun fire and the barn was then set on fire.

According to eye-witness Stepan Radion, after the destruction of Klubochyn and its residents, the Kreislandwirt seized the remaining property left in the village and brought them to Tsuman, where Poles were heard rejoicing-"Now you have your Ukraine. We will finish all of you off now".

The Germans then returned to Tsumna, where 150 Ukrainians included from the neighbouring village of Bashlyky were ordered to dig pits into which they fell after being machine-gunned. Also after Klubochyn the residents of Malyntsi were burned alive in the village church whilst "similar pogroms of Ukrainians took place in Mylovtsi and other villages'.

The Polish individual responsible for preparing the list for the Sicherheitsdienst was executed by the Ukrainian nationalist underground. It is alleged that the Ukrainian Insurgents also killed a number of Germans in the surrounding area.

After the end of World War II, the Jewish survivors from Trochenbrod, numbering between 33 and 40, lived in the area of nearby Lutsk.

Trochenbrod in literature
A fictionalized historical portrayal of the shtetl life at Trachimbrod was featured in the 2002 non-fiction novel Everything Is Illuminated by Jonathan Safran Foer as well as in the 2005 film based on the novel.

Safran Foer, whose father and grandfather came from Trochenbrod, depicts fictionalized events in the village beginning in 1791 – the year in which the shtetl was first named – until 1942, when it was destroyed in the war. Safran Foer's modern-day protagonist (who goes by the author's name and also by the name "Hero", or "the Collector" in the film version) comes to contemporary Ukraine to look for a woman named Augustine, who saved his grandfather in the war. The novel was criticized for omitting numerous historical details and distorting history by a reviewer from Ukraine published by The Prague Post online.

Beyond Trochenbrod, a memoir of a childhood in Trochenbrod disrupted by the Holocaust, was published in 2014. The author, Betty Gold, also gave oral testimonies on the events.

Notes

References
  A book about the combined towns of Trochenbrod and Lozisht.
 Everything is illuminated (2005) - a film about a young Jewish American man endeavors to find the woman who saved his grandfather's life during World War 2 in a Ukrainian village Trochenbrod, that was ultimately razed by the Nazis, with the help of an eccentric local.
 Trochenbrod & Lozisht community website
 Zofiówka (8.) in the Geographical Dictionary of the Kingdom of Poland (1895)

See also
Lozisht

The Holocaust in Ukraine
Einsatzgruppen
History of Volyn Oblast
Former populated places in Ukraine
Jewish ghettos in Nazi-occupied Poland
Historic Jewish communities in Ukraine
Historic Jewish communities in Poland
Shtetls
Populated places established in 1835
Holocaust locations in Poland
Holocaust locations in Ukraine